When Taekwondo Strikes (Chinese: 跆拳震九州, also known as Sting of the Dragon Masters and Taekwondo Heroes) is a 1973 Hong Kong martial arts film directed and written by Feng Huang, and produced by Raymond Chow. The film is known for the collective martial arts experience of its cast and the high-quality fight choreography. The film stars an international cast of martial arts film actors, including Angela Mao, Jhoon Rhee (the father of American Taekwondo), Anne Winton, Wong In Sik (Ing-Sik Whang), Carter Wong, Kenji Kazama, Sammo Hung, Biao Yuen, and Golden Harvest producer Andre Morgan. This was Jhoon Rhee's only film, and Anne Winton's debut film.

Plot
The story is about the Korea under Japanese rule during World War II. A Korean nationalist played by Carter Wong gets into a fight with some Japanese people and is chased into a church.  The priest there is captured and tortured. Trying to secure his release, the leader of the resistance, Jhoon Rhee is himself captured and tortured by the Japanese. Carter Wong, Angela Mao and Anne Winton have to now try and rescue him. This leads to an explosive climax with the heroes having to fight the likes of Wong In Sik (Hwang In-Shik), Sammo Hung and Kenji Kazama.

Background
Rhee landed the role in the film with help from his friend Bruce Lee whom he met in 1964 while both were performing demonstrations at an international karate event held in Long Beach, California. In 1972, Lee went to Golden Harvest Films boss Raymond Chow with the idea of making a movie about Taekwondo with Rhee in lead role. Rhee who never thought of himself as an actor didn't think it would come to fruition but a year later in the summer of 1973, Rhee was flying to Hong Kong to star in the film which was set in Korea, playing the part of Master Lee, a leader of a group of underground patriots. The plot for the film was based on a synopsis written by Rhee. It didn't take long to produce the film and by 19 July Rhee was back in the United States. This was when Bruce Lee called him to let him know that the film's editing had been done and it was ready for release. Rhee was looking at the possibility of more film work but with Lee's death which was around the film's release and the possibility of being away from his family didn't appeal to him. So this became his first and last film. 
 
This was the first film for Rhee. It was also the first film for Anne Winton, a 23‐year‐old student from Washington. An article in the Lowell Sun suggested that Winton's role, with her as a blonde American girl in the film along with some other new approaches may have also been for international appeal and profit. Winton who had studied ballet at the University of Michigan came to Washington in the early 1970s. Later she attained a black belt in Taekwondo.
Playing the part of Mary, the niece of the Catholic priest Father Louis, she, according to reviewer World Film Geek held her own quite well in the role. Far East Films in its review said she was surprisingly both powerful in fighting ability and acting.

Cast
Jhoon Rhee – Lee Chung Tung / Li Jun Dong
Angela Mao – Wan Ling Ching / Huang Li Chen
Anne Winton – Marie
Andre E. Morgan – Father Louis
Carter Wong – Jin Zheng Zhi
Chin Chun – Zhou
Wong Fung – Lieutenant Makibayashi (Japanese: 陸軍中尉牧林, Rikugun-Chūi Makibayashi)
Wong In Sik (Hwang In-Shik) – Japanese Leader
Kenji Kazama – Japanese Leader
Sammo Hung – Japanese
Alan Chui Chung-San - Japanese
Yuen Biao - Japanese (extra)
Lam Ching-Ying - Japanese (extra)
Wilson Tong - Korean at restaurant
Baan Yun-Sang - Japanese
Billy Chan - Japanese (extra)
King Lee - Japanese
Hsu Hsia - Japanese (extra)
Po Tai - Japanese

Reception
The movie has a mixed reception from critics.

References

External links 
 

1973 films
Hong Kong martial arts films
Taekwondo films
Pacific War films
Films set in Korea under Japanese rule
Japan in non-Japanese culture
1970s Hong Kong films